Maroggia-Melano railway station is a railway station in the Swiss canton of Ticino. The station is located on the border between the municipalities of Maroggia and Melano, and serves both. The station is on the Swiss Federal Railways Gotthard railway, between Lugano and Chiasso.

Services 
 the following services stop at Maroggia-Melano:

References

External links 
 
 

Railway stations in Ticino
Swiss Federal Railways stations